The Rt Hon. Brian Henry Mulholland, 6th Baron Dunleath, DL (born 25 September 1950), is a Northern Irish hereditary peer and former politician. His ancestral seat is Ballywalter Park, a country house at Ballywalter on the Ards in County Down.

Life
Lord Dunleath was educated at Tor Bank.

In 1997 he succeeded to the title of Baron Dunleath and took his seat in the House of Lords. He was excluded from the House in 1999 with most of the other hereditary peers with the House of Lords Act 1999. He is a Deputy Lieutenant of County Down.

References

Sources
http://www.thepeerage.com/p8074.htm
 http://hansard.millbanksystems.com/people/mr-brian-mulholland

1950 births
Living people
People educated at Eton College
Barons in the Peerage of the United Kingdom
Deputy Lieutenants of Down
Dunleath